Won-yong is a Korean masculine given name. Its meaning differs based on the hanja used to write each syllable of the name. There are 35 hanja with the reading "won" and 24 hanja with the reading "yong" on the South Korean government's official list of hanja which may be registered for use in given names. Additionally, there is one character with the reading "ryong" (meaning "dragon") which may also be written and pronounced "yong" in South Korea.

People with this name include:
Kang Won-yong (1917–2006), South Korean Presbyterian leader
Kim Won-yong (1922–1993), South Korean archaeologist
Wonyong Sung (born 1950s), South Korean professor of electronic engineering
Jung Won-yong (born 1992), South Korean swimmer

See also
List of Korean given names

References

Korean masculine given names